Lee Township is a former township of Pope County, Arkansas. It was located in the southeast corner of the county.

Cities, towns, and villages
 Atkins (part)
 Wilson

References
 United States Board on Geographic Names (GNIS)
 United States National Atlas

External links
US-Counties.com

Townships in Pope County, Arkansas
Townships in Arkansas